Bhikhari Das (1721 – ?)was an early 18th-century Indian poet of riti kaal. He was son of Kripaldas, enjoyed the patronage of Hindupati Singh, younger brother of Raja Prithvipati Singh of Pratapgarh.

Early life 
He was born in village Teonga in 1721 in Pratapgarh, Uttar Pradesh.

Literary works 
 Ras Saransh
 Chhandarnav Pingal 
 Kavya Nirnay
 Shringaar Nirnay
 Naamprakash Kosh
 Vishnupuran Bhasha': (Chuapai)
 Chhand Prakash Shatranjshatika Amarprakash'' (Sanskrit)
    buga buga

References 

18th-century Indian poets
Indian male poets
Year of birth unknown
Year of death unknown
Poets from Uttar Pradesh
18th-century male writers